Kevin Christopher Belnavis (born July 12, 1982), better known by his stage name Torch, is a Haitian-American rapper signed to Maybach Music Group as part of the group Triple C's. Born and with a childhood in the Castle Hill area of the Bronx, he was sent by his mother to live with his older sister in Miami, Florida, as a teen.

While living in Miami, he met William Leonard Roberts II, who came to be better known as musician Rick Ross; a Miami rapper called Gunplay, and rapper Young Breed; together, the four young men formed the Southern rap group Triple C's (aka Carol City Cartel).

Childhood

Torch was born Kevin Christopher Belnavis to his parents Lorna and Christopher Belnavis on July 12, 1982 in the Castle Hill area of the Bronx, New York City. Kevin spent most of his childhood on the streets of this rough neighborhood and earned the nickname "Torch" for his volatile and unpredictable misbehavior. Fearful of the dangerous path her son was on, his mother Lorna sent Torch to Miami, Florida to live with his older sister. While living in Miami, Torch met Rick Ross, Gunplay, and Young Breed, future members of his Triple C's group.

Education

Though skilled with words and wit, Torch struggled academically. Having attended PS 136 and Junior High School 125 in New York, he was expelled from three high schools before finding an advocate in the principal at the fourth. At Lehman High School, the school principal helped Torch catch up in his classes and makeup months of neglected work to graduate on time with his class. While in high school, Torch met Kenta "Geter K" Geter, future VP of Maybach Music Group, with whom he later signed.

Incarceration

In 2005, Torch served a brief sentence in a New York state prison on drug charges. Shortly after his release, Rick Ross shot to fame with his platinum single "Hustlin'." Torch has said that he began to believe that his own life might amount to something larger than the struggle on the streets.

Music

Triple C's

Newly out of prison, Torch joined Rick Ross, Gunplay and Young Breed to form the rap group Triple C's (aka Carol City Cartel). The group was recorded and featured on Ross's certified gold albums, Port of Miami (2006) and Trilla (2008). Their own first studio album, Custom Cars & Cycles, was released in 2009. The album reached peak positions of number two on the Billboard Rap Album chart and number 44 on Billboard's Top 200.

After releasing a series of independent mixtapes, Torch was given music's official stamp of approval from L.A. Reid, who dubbed the rapper, "what hip-hop's been missing."

Specialyst Entertainment

Torch is also CEO of Specialyst Entertainment, a music and artist management company based in New York.

Discography

Collaboration albums
2009: Custom Cars & Cycles (with Triple C's)
TBA: Color, Cut & Clarity (with Triple C's)

Compilation albums
2011: Self Made Vol. 1 (with Maybach Music Group)
2013: Self Made Vol. 3 (with Maybach Music Group)

Mixtapes
2008: Ski Mask Music
2010: Krash Kourse
2011: U.F.O. (Underestimated, Forgotten, & Overlooked) Vol. 1
2012: U.F.O. Vol. 2
2012: No A/C
2013: Tax Season
2013: Da Bronx Zoo
2013: No AC Vol. 2
Collaboration mixtapes
2008: Victory Lap
2009: Multi Millionaires
2009: White Sand
2011: Black Flag

Guest appearances

References

sort key
Living people
African-American male rappers
American people convicted of drug offenses
Southern hip hop musicians
Rappers from the Bronx
Rappers from Miami
21st-century American rappers
21st-century American male musicians
21st-century African-American musicians
20th-century African-American people